Iván Maestro Martínez (born 17 December 1988) is a Spanish motorcycle racer. His brother, Borja Maestro, is also a motorcycle racer.

Career statistics

Grand Prix motorcycle racing

By season

Races by year

References

External links
 Profile on MotoGP.com

Living people
1988 births
Spanish motorcycle racers
125cc World Championship riders
250cc World Championship riders